Su patriotu sardu a sos feudatarios ("The Sardinian Patriot to the Lords"), widely known also by its incipit as  Procurade 'e moderare ("Endeavor to moderate"), is a protest and antifeudal folk song in the culture of Sardinia.

The anthem was written in Sardinian language by the lawyer Francesco Ignazio Mannu (Frantziscu Ignàtziu Mannu) on the occasion of Sardinian revolution, a series of mass revolts (1793–1796) against the Savoyard feudal system, that culminated with the execution or expulsion from the island of the officials of the ruling House of Savoy on 28 April 1794 (officially commemorated today as Sa die de sa Sardigna, "Sardinian people's day"). Because of its temporal coincidence with the French revolution, the song was also nicknamed by J. W. Tyndale and other scholars like Auguste Boullier as "the Sardinian Marseillaise".<ref>Boullier,  L’île de Sardaigne, cit., pp. 94–95</ref>

Long regarded as a national anthem in Sardinian culture, Su patriotu sardu a sos feudatarios was officially declared as the island's anthem in 2018."Procurade 'e moderare" inno ufficiale della Sardegna: ecco il testo con la traduzione, YouTG.net“Procurade ‘e Moderare” è l'inno ufficiale della Sardegna, Consiglio Regionale della Sardegna

Text
The anthem is a poetry written in octave with a metrical pattern of a bb cc dd e, and its content resounds with typical Enlightenment themes. The entire text consists of 47 stanzas for a total of 376 verses, and describes the miserable state of Sardinia at the end of the XVIII° century, kept as an overseas dependency of the House of Savoy with an archaic feudal system that would only advantage the feudatories and leave a Sard only with "a rope to hang himself" (stanza 34, verse 272).

The incipit is, in fact, addressed to the Lords' arrogance, regarded as the people being most at fault for the island's decadence: Procurad'e moderare, Barones, sa tirannia… ("Endeavor to moderate, Oh barons! your tyranny...").

The disastrous socio-economic situation plaguing the island is described in detail. The oppressors from the Mainland are also harshly criticized: according to the poet, they did not care about Sardinia, and the only thing that would concern them was to surround themselves with richness and loot through the cheap exploitation of the island's resources, in a manner analogous to what Spain had done on the Indies ("Sardinia to the Piedmonteise Was as a golden land, What Spain found in the Indies They discovered here": stanza 32, verse 249–251).

The chant closes with a vigorous incitement to revolt, sealed with a terse Sardinian saying: Cando si tenet su bentu est prezisu bentulare ("When the wind is in your harbour, Is the proper time to winnow": stanza 47, verse 375–376).

Here, following the original text in Sardinian.

Editions, translations and literary critique
The anthem was illegally published in Sassari in 1796 and not in the nearby island of Corsica, as it was believed until recently. After all, Sassari was already taken by the rebels and, in 1796, ruled by the alternos Giovanni Maria Angioy.

The song was first translated into another language from Sardinian by John Warre Tyndale in 1849 (Endeavor to moderate...), while Auguste Boullier would publish a French translation in his own book (Essai sur le dialecte et les chants populaires de la Sardaigne) in June 1864 with the incipit being Songez à modérer....

The anthem, aside from any copy that had been illegally circulating on the island, was published for the first time in Sardinia in 1865 by Giovanni SpanoP. A. Bianco – F. Cheratzu, Su patriotu sardu a sos feudatarios, Sassari, 1991, p. 70 and later by Enrico Costa, who also made an Italian translation. Sebastiano Satta would provide another Italian translation on the centenary of Giovanni Maria Angioy's triumphant entrance in the city. In 1979, B. Granzer and B. Schütze would translate the song into German, with the title Die Tyrannei.

Raffa Garzia compared the song to Giuseppe Parini's "Il giorno". The scholar also drew attention to another two poems having a similar subject: one by the Ploaghese poet Maria Baule about the attempted French invasion of the island in 1793, with the title Ancòra semus in gherra ("we are still in war"), that was published by Giovanni Spano; the other one, always addressing the events of 1793, by the Gavoese poet Michele Carboni (1764–1814) titled Animu, patriottas, a sa gherra! ("Come on, patriots, to war!").

Interpreters
 Maria Teresa Cau
 Maria Carta
 Peppino Marotto
 Gruppo Rubanu (Orgosolo)
 Tazenda and Andrea Parodi
 Piero Marras, Maria Giovanna Cherchi
 Kenze Neke
 Elena Ledda
 Cordas et Cannas, in Cantos e musicas de sa Sardigna (1983)
 Coro Supramonte
 Pino Masi
 Savina Yannatou
 Stefano Saletti, Piccola Banda Ikona, with Ambrogio Sparagna

See also
 Music of Sardinia
 Sa die de sa Sardigna

References

Bibliography
 A. Bouiller, Essai sur le dialecte et les chants populaires de la Sardaigne, Paris 1864
 A. Bouiller, L'île de Sardaigne. Dialecte et chants populaires, Paris 1865 (in Italian: I canti popolari della Sardegna. a cura di Raffa Garzia, Bologna 1916.)
 Raffa Garzia, Il canto d'una rivoluzione , Cagliari, 1899.
 Pier Ausonio Bianco – Francesco Cheratzu, Su patriotu sardu a sos feudatarios, Sassari, Condaghes, 1998, 
 Luciano Carta, (a cura di), Francesco Ignazio Mannu, Su patriotu sardu a sos feudatarios'', Cagliari, 2002

External links
 The English version by Tyndale compared to the original one
 Su patriotu Sardu a sos feudatarios (Procurad' e moderare), Antiwarsong.org (provides also translations into English and other languages)

Sardinian culture
Sardinian folk songs
Patriotic songs
18th-century songs
Italian anthems
Regional songs